Touro Hall was a building at 10th and Carpenter Streets in the Bella Vista neighborhood of South Philadelphia. It was named for Judah Touro, a public-spirited citizen of New Orleans and well-known philanthropist, who bequeathed $20,000 to the Hebrew Education Society of Philadelphia in 1854. The building was constructed to provide Jewish education and social resources for the neighborhood's growing Jewish immigrant community.

Touro Hall was built and opened in 1891 by the Hebrew Education Society, and featured a bathing pool and library. It was home to Hebrew School No. 2, and served as a center for Jewish life in South Philadelphia through the 1920s. Fabiani Italian Hospital was located in Touro Hall from the 1920s until its closure in 1968. The building was demolished in 1977, and replaced with Bardascino Park in 1978.

Hebrew Education Society of Philadelphia

Rabbi Isaac Leeser came to Philadelphia to serve at Mikveh Israel in 1829. In addition to leading the synagogue, he published a Jewish newspaper, authored Bible translations, prayer books, and education materials, and in 1848 directed the organization of the Hebrew Education Society of Philadelphia. 

The Hebrew Education Society opened Hebrew School No. 2 in 1878, and Philadelphia Jewish philanthropist David Sulzberger was a significant donor and led the construction of Touro Hall in 1891. The Hebrew Education Society purchased the land at 10th and Carpenter in 1891 from Alexander Parker who had operated a botanical garden on the land. Construction began on April 11, 1891. 

The corner was depicted in 1845 with a small building that had dated to approximately 1820.

Jewish Community Center

Touro Hall served as one of the centers of Jewish life in South Philadelphia's neighborhoods between 1890 and the 1940s. Many Jewish organizations held activities at Touro Hall including the Southern Branch of the Young Men's and Young Women's Hebrew Association, an employment agency, assistance for recent immigrants, and multiple charitable efforts. It was used for Hebrew school, Sunday School, and English night school, trade schools for tin-smithing, carpentry, iron work, dress-making and millinery, garment cutting, upholstering, cigar-making, typewriting, stenography, and drawing, for lectures and entertainment, a University Extension, and a free synagogue.

Community Hospital

Giuseppe Fabiani founded Fabiani Italian Hospital to serve the neighborhood's Italian community in 1904 in a building at 10th and Christian Streets. The hospital had moved to the southwest corner of 10th and Carpenter Streets and into Tours Hall by 1927.

The name changed to Philadelphia Italian Hospital in 1936, and to Community Hospital in 1942. Community Hospital closed in 1968 and the building was demolished in 1977.

Bardascino Park
 The City of Philadelphia created Bardascino Park on the former Touro Hall site in 1978, named for Giuseppe Bardascino, longtime maestro of the Philadelphia Brass Band, and manager of the Philadelphia Italian Band who was a longtime resident of the neighborhood.

The Friends of Bardascino Park formed in 1991 to beautify the park. In 1999 the group became a part of the Parks Revitalization Project, a collaborative partnership between the City of Philadelphia's Department of Recreation and the Pennsylvania Horticultural Society's Philadelphia Green initiative.

The group has secured multiple community partnerships and grants, renovated the park in 2003 and 2004, and has continued to maintain it. The park has an active bocce court and the park's summer bocce league began in 1997.

Friends of Bardascino Park updated the park's sign at 10th and Carpenter Streets with more detailed history and maps in December 2020.

References

External links

Jewish day schools in the United States
Jews and Judaism in Pennsylvania
Jews and Judaism in Philadelphia
Demolished buildings and structures in Philadelphia
Demolished religious buildings and structures
Buildings and structures demolished in 1977